Gruhalakshmi is a 1938 Indian Telugu-language drama film produced and directed by H. M. Reddy. It was the maiden film for Rohini Pictures and V. Nagayya. The film was adaptation of the popular stage play Rangoon Rowdy (1929) written by Somaraju Ramanuja Rao. The film was commercially successful. K. V. Reddy worked as a cashier for Rohini Pictures for this film in the beginning of his career.

Songs 
 "Badha Sahaname"
 "Kallu Manandoi Kallu Teravandoi"
 "Lendu Bharata Veeru Laara"
 "Naa Premaye"
 "Sagamu Ratiri Ayyane"
 "Yasodha Nandana"

References

External links 
 

1930s Telugu-language films
1938 films
Films directed by H. M. Reddy
Indian drama films
1938 drama films
Indian black-and-white films
Films scored by Prabhala Satyanarayana